ORG-25935, also known as SCH-900435 is a synthetic drug developed by Organon International, which acts as a selective inhibitor of the glycine transporter GlyT-1. In animal tests it reduces alcohol consumption and has analgesic and anticonvulsant effects, but it has mainly been studied for its antipsychotic properties, and in human trials it was shown to effectively counteract the effects of the dissociative drug ketamine.

See also 
 Glycine reuptake inhibitor

References 

Drugs acting on the nervous system
Glycine reuptake inhibitors